Carmi is a biblical name and may also refer to:

Carmi (surname)
Carmi, Illinois, in White County, Illinois, United States
Carmi-White County High School, a high school located in Carmi
Carmi Air Force Station, a closed United States Air Force General Surveillance Radar station
Carmi, British Columbia, a locality in the South Okanagan region of British Columbia, Canada
, a tributary of the West Kettle River in British Columbia, Canada
Carmi Mine, the namesake of the locality and creek, and named after Carmi, Illinois